In the motorsport discipline of rallying, Group Rally5 is a formula of rally car specification determined by the FIA for use in its international rallying competitions: World Rally Championship (WRC) and regional championships. National rallying competitions also allow Group Rally5 cars to compete. There are no subclasses of the group therefore all Group Rally5 cars can compete in the same category. 'Rally5' may be used alone with the same definition. The group was launched in 2019 after the introduction of the Rally Pyramid initiative to reorganise the classes of car and championships in international rallying was approved in June 2018.

The formula for Group Rally5 cars was taken from R1 class of Group R with the defining ruleset interchanging the terms, this meant that any existing R1 car homologated or approved since their introduction in 2008 could continue to be used in Rally5 level competition. The subclasses defined in R1 however have effectively merged and capacity of permitted turbocharged engines have increased to 1333cc.

Definition
Group Rally5 cars are defined in FIA document Appendix J - Article 260 as Touring Cars or Large Scale Series Production Cars, supercharged Petrol engine (including rotary engines), 2-wheel drive (front or rear wheel drive). A production touring car with at least 2500 identical units manufactured must be homologated in Group A, with all the requirements that make it a Group Rally5 car homologated in an extension. They have a power to weight ratio of 6.4kg/hp.

Rally5 rules are relaxed in comparison to the other Groups Rally formulae making it the most cost efficient and accessible. Only the bodyshell (with safety cage), the seat mountings and the harness need to be homologated, the latter two already having their own Appendix J ruleset outside of Rally5. Bodyshells homologated under Group Rally4 regulations are also permitted in Group Rally5 therefore potentially expanding the range of cars available. Most components of the original Group A model can be used and in many cases are free to replace, however in such cases the performance criteria of Rally5 must always be met.

FIA Competition
Rally5 cars are placed in FIA 'RC5' sporting class alone.

Cars

In addition to the above, bodyshells (and safety cage) homologated in Group Rally4 since 2020 would also be accepted subject to meeting Rally5 criteria elsewhere. For example, where original parts must be used, or power and weight limits met:

 Opel Corsa Rally4
 Peugeot 208 Rally4

See also
 Rally Pyramid
 Groups Rally
Group Rally1
Group Rally2
Group Rally2-Kit
Group Rally3
Group Rally4

References

External links

 

 
Rally groups